
Year 250 (CCL) was a common year starting on Tuesday (link will display the full calendar) of the Julian calendar. At the time, it was known as the Year of the Consulship of Traianus and Gratus (or, less frequently, year 1003 Ab urbe condita). The denomination 250 for this year has been used since the early medieval period, when the Anno Domini calendar era became the prevalent method in Europe for naming years.

Events 
 By place 

 Roman Empire 
 A group of Franks penetrate as far as Tarragona in Spain (approximate date).
 The Goths under King Cniva invade Moesia. They cross the Danube and lay siege to Novae and Marcianopolis.
 Battle of Augusta Traiana: The Romans lose the battle against the Goths.
 Cniva lays siege to Philippopolis (modern Plovdiv). After a long resistance, Cniva conquers the city and slays its one hundred thousand inhabitants.
 The Alamanni drive the Romans from the modern area of Donau-Ries.  
 An epidemic begins in Ethiopia, moves into Egypt and the Roman colonies in North Africa, and spreads through the Roman Empire (named the Plague of Cyprian, after St. Cyprian, bishop of Carthage).

 Africa 
 The Kingdom of Aksum (Axum) takes control of commerce on the Red Sea.

 Asia 
 The earliest Chinese references to a device known as "emperor's south-pointing carriage" date to this period.

 Mesomerica 
 Teotihuacán is rebuilt as a four-quartered cosmogram by Zapotec architects brought from Monte Albán in Oaxaca.
 Classic period of Mesoamerican civilization begins.

 By topic 

 Art and science 
 Diophantus writes Arithmetica, the first systematic treatise on algebra.
 Approximate date
 The family portrait medallion, traditionally called the Family of Vunnerius Keramus, is made (it is later placed in the Brescia Cross, and then in the Museo Civico dell'Etá Cristiana, Brescia).
 The Ludovisi Battle sarcophagus, depicting battle between the Romans and the Barbarians, is made for use in Rome (it is later moved to the collection of the National Roman Museum).
 The Igel Column is erected at Trier in Germany.

 Religion 
 January 3 – Decian persecution of Christians is initiated when Emperor Decius orders everyone in the Roman Empire (except Jews) to perform a sacrifice to the gods of religion in ancient Rome. On January 20, Pope Fabian becomes one of the first martyrs of this persecution.
 Possible date – Denis, a bishop of Paris, is martyred by beheading.

Births 
 March 31 – Constantius Chlorus, Roman emperor (d. 306)
 Gaius Galerius Valerius Maximianus, Roman emperor (d. 311)
 Lu Jing (or Shiren), Chinese general and writer (d. 280)
 Maximian (Herculius), Roman consul and emperor (d. 310)
 Zuo Si (or Taichong), Chinese poet and writer (d. 305)

Deaths 
 January 20 – Fabian (or Fabianus), pope of Rome
 Du Qiong (or Boyu), Chinese official and astronomer
 Faustus, Abibus and Dionysius, Christian martyrs
 Marcus Minucius Felix, Roman apologist and writer
 Peter, Andrew, Paul and Denise, Christian martyrs
 Secundian, Marcellian and Verian, Christian martyrs
 Tryphon, Respicius, and Nympha, Christian martyrs
 Zhu Ju, Chinese general and chancellor (b. 194)

References